"Drip Drop" is a song written by Jerry Leiber and Mike Stoller.  It was first recorded by the Drifters in 1958, and more successfully by Dion in 1963.

The Drifters 
The Drifters released the original version of the song as a single in 1958. It reached number 58 on the Billboard Hot 100. The Drifters' version was produced by Leiber & Stoller and arranged by Ray Ellis.

Dion 
Dion's version of the song reached number 6 on the Billboard Hot 100 in 1963. The back-up group on the song is the Del-Satins, and the guitarist was Al Caiola. The song was produced and arranged by Robert Mersey.

References 

1958 songs
1958 singles
1963 singles
Songs written by Jerry Leiber and Mike Stoller
Dion DiMucci songs
The Drifters songs
Columbia Records singles
Atlantic Records singles